In abstract algebra, a conjugacy class sum, or simply class sum, is a function defined for each conjugacy class of a finite group G as the sum of the elements in that conjugacy class. The class sums of a group form a basis for the center of the associated group algebra.

Definition
Let G be a finite group, and let C1,...,Ck be the distinct conjugacy classes of G. For 1 ≤ i ≤ k, define

The functions  are the class sums of G.

In the group algebra 
Let CG be the complex group algebra over G. Then the center of CG, denoted Z(CG), is defined by

.

This is equal to the set of all class functions (functions which are constant on conjugacy classes). To see this, note that f is central if and only if f(yx) = f(xy) for all x,y in G. Replacing y by yx−1, this condition becomes

.

The class sums are a basis for the set of all class functions, and thus they are a basis for the center of the algebra.

In particular, this shows that the dimension of Z(CG) is equal to the number of class sums of G.

References
 Goodman, Roe; and Wallach, Nolan (2009). Symmetry, Representations, and Invariants. Springer. .  See chapter 4, especially 4.3.
 James, Gordon; and Liebeck, Martin (2001). Representations and Characters of Groups (2nd ed.). Cambridge University Press. .  See chapter 12.

Group theory